Sagwon is a small unincorporated community in North Slope Borough, Alaska, United States.  It is above the Arctic Circle.  It is known for the Gallagher Flint Station Archeological Site which was discovered during the construction of the Trans-Alaska Pipeline.

References

Populated places of the Arctic United States
Unincorporated communities in North Slope Borough, Alaska
Unincorporated communities in Alaska